The Stewart-Clark Baronetcy, of Dundas in the County of West Lothian, is a title in the Baronetage of the United Kingdom. It was created on 12 February 1918 for John Stewart-Clark. He was a director of the firm of Clark & Co. Born John Clark, he assumed the additional surname of Stewart in 1909.

The family seat is Dundas Castle, South Queensferry, West Lothian.

Stewart-Clark baronets, of Dundas (1918)
Sir John Stewart-Clark, 1st Baronet (1864–1924)
Sir Stewart Stewart-Clark, 2nd Baronet (1904–1971)
Sir John Stewart-Clark, 3rd Baronet (born 1929)

The heir apparent is the current baronet's only son, Alexander Dudley Stewart-Clark (born 1960). There is no further heir to the title.

Sir John Stewart-Clark, 1st Baronet, was the son of Stewart Clark, a politician and thread entrepreneur.

References

Kidd, Charles, Williamson, David (editors). Debrett's Peerage and Baronetage (1990 edition). New York: St Martin's Press, 1990.

Stewart-Clark